Aphanopetalum is a genus of twining shrubs or vines in the family Aphanopetalaceae which are endemic to Australia.

The genus is placed alone in family Aphanopetalaceae, which is in turn now placed in order Saxifragales. Until recently this family was placed in Oxalidales, and before that the genus was included in family  Cunoniaceae, also within Oxalidales. The type species is Aphanopetalum resinosum.
There are two species:
Aphanopetalum clematideum (Harv.) Domin, endemic to limestone cliffs of south western Australia
Aphanopetalum resinosum Endl. - gum vine, endemic to southern Queensland and New South Wales

The Aphanopetalaceae are scrambling shrubs with lenticellate stems, having opposite and serrate leaves with minute "stipules". The flowers and inflorescences are  axillary. The flowers are essentially without petals, and have four large, white sepals that enlarge when in fruit (which is single-seeded).

References

External links

Saxifragales genera
Saxifragales of Australia
Saxifragales